Tublje pri Komnu is a small settlement in the Municipality of Sežana in the Littoral region of Slovenia close to the border with Italy.

Name
The name of the settlement was changed from Tublje to Tublje pri Komnu in 1953.

References

External links
Tublje pri Komnu on Geopedia

Populated places in the Municipality of Sežana